Cornelis Sibe (born 22 April 1983) is a Surinamese middle-distance runner. He competed in the men's 800 metres at the 2004 Summer Olympics.

References

1983 births
Living people
Athletes (track and field) at the 2004 Summer Olympics
Surinamese male middle-distance runners
Olympic athletes of Suriname
Place of birth missing (living people)